The Chalaronne is a  long river in the Ain department in eastern France. Its source is at Lapeyrouse, in the Dombes. It flows generally northwest. It is a left tributary of the Saône, into which it flows between Saint-Didier-sur-Chalaronne and Thoissey.

Communes along its course
This list is ordered from source to mouth: Lapeyrouse, Birieux, Villars-les-Dombes, Bouligneux, La Chapelle-du-Châtelard, Marlieux, Saint-Germain-sur-Renon, Sandrans, Romans, Châtillon-sur-Chalaronne, L'Abergement-Clémenciat, Dompierre-sur-Chalaronne, Saint-Étienne-sur-Chalaronne, Saint-Didier-sur-Chalaronne, Thoissey,

References

Rivers of France
Rivers of Auvergne-Rhône-Alpes
Rivers of Ain